This is a list of books about negotiation and negotiation theory by year of publication.

2010s
 Jung, Stefanie; Krebs, Peter (2019). The Essentials of Contract Negotiation. Springer. .

2000s
 
 Matthias Schranner (2008). Costly Mistakes. Leck: CPI Books GmbH. 
 
 
 
  (Includes chapters by I. William Zartman and others.)
 
 
 
 
  (Includes chapters on Lawrence Susskind, William Ury, and others.)

1990s
 
 
 
 
 
 
 
 
 
 
  (Includes chapters by Max H. Bazerman, Roger Fisher, Mary Parker Follett, William Ury, I. William Zartman, and others.)
 
  (Includes chapters by Max H. Bazerman and others.)

1980s

pre-1980s
 
 

Business books
Negotiation
Negotiation